Sajjan Singh Verma is an Indian politician, and a member of Indian National Congress, currently serving as an MLA from Sonkatch in Madhya Pradesh. He was a member of the 15th Lok Sabha of India representing the Dewas Lok Sabha constituency of Madhya Pradesh. He is national president of Akhil Bhartiya Khatik Samaj. Verma resigned in March 2020 as PWD Minister, when the Congress Government led by Chief Minister Kamalnath was toppled by the BJP.

Early life and education
Sajjan Singh Verma holds Master of Arts (in Sociology) degree from G.A.C.C., Indore, Madhya Pradesh.

Posts Held

See also
Madhya Pradesh Legislative Assembly
2013 Madhya Pradesh Legislative Assembly election
2008 Madhya Pradesh Legislative Assembly election

References

External links

|-

Indian National Congress politicians from Madhya Pradesh
Politicians from Indore
Living people
India MPs 2009–2014
1952 births
Madhya Pradesh MLAs 1985–1990
Madhya Pradesh MLAs 1998–2003
Madhya Pradesh MLAs 2008–2013
People from Dewas
People from Dewas district
Madhya Pradesh MLAs 2018–2023